The definition of a city in Australia varies between the states. State capital cities may include multiple local government areas (LGAs) within their boundaries and these LGAs may be cities in their own right. 

Cities listed below are those as defined by the states in which they are located. Also included are former cities that have lost city status due to LGA amalgamations or other factors.

Australian Capital Territory 
 Canberra (national and territory capital city)

New South Wales 

Since 1993, only local government areas in New South Wales can be declared as "cities" by the Government, under the Local Government Act 1993. Although the present version of the Act specifies no criteria for city status, a previous version of the Act specified that to be a city, a Council area must:
(a) have a population of at least 25,000 persons and be an independent centre of population; not being a suburb, whether residential, industrial, commercial or maritime, of any other council area or centre of population; or
(b) have a population of at least 150,000, and have a distinct character and entity as a centre of population beyond what would normally be regarded as being of local or suburban significance only; or
(c) satisfy the criteria specified in paragraphs (a) or (b) apart from the population criteria, and be a homogenous centre of importance as a focus of regional commercial, governmental or cultural activity beyond that which would normally be regarded as local, suburban, or subsidiary to another nearby centre.

New South Wales, therefore, has two types of "city": cities that are acknowledged on the register of the Geographical Names Board of New South Wales, and local government areas that have been proclaimed as cities but are not acknowledged on the Geographical Names Register.

Cities acknowledged on the NSW Geographical Names Register

Cities not acknowledged on the NSW Geographical Names Register 
This list includes local government areas inside the Sydney metropolitan area but excludes cities also acknowledged on the Geographical Names Register.

Former local government areas that were accorded city status (however since amalgamated) include:

Northern Territory 

 Darwin (Territory capital)
 Palmerston

Queensland 

Other towns or suburban areas whose local government was accorded city status (including those since amalgamated) include:
 Charters Towers
 Redcliffe City
 Redland City
 Thuringowa
 Warwick

South Australia

Tasmania 

 Hobart (state capital), the metropolitan area of which consists of the City of Clarence, City of Hobart, and the City of Glenorchy
 Burnie
 Devonport
 Launceston

Victoria

Western Australia 

Local government areas with city status not listed above, all of which lie within Perth's metropolitan area, include:

See also 
 List of cities in Australia by population
 Lists of cities by country
 Lists of cities in Oceania
 List of cities in Oceania by population

Notes

References

External links 

A Gazetteer of Australian Cities, Towns and Suburbs  (Monash University)
Detailed map of cities of Australia

 
Demographics of Australia